Reel Theatres is a movie theater chain in the United States owned by Casper Management—an Idaho corporation—that features independent and foreign films. It operates theaters in Idaho, Oregon and Utah.

Locations
Idaho Theaters:
 Boise:
 Northgate Reel;
 Country Club Reel
 Nampa
 Nampa Reel 
 Eagle
 Eagle Luxe Reel
 Caldwell
 Caldwell Luxe Reel
 Ontario
 Ontario Luxe Reel

See also
 List of movie theaters and cinema chains

External links
 Official website
 Construction pictures Reel Theatre Ontario, Oregon

Companies based in Idaho
Cinemas and movie theaters in Idaho
Cinemas and movie theaters in Oregon
Cinemas and movie theaters in Utah
Economy of the Northwestern United States
Movie theatre chains in the United States